Rupganj is an upazila of Narayanganj District in the Division of Dhaka, Bangladesh.

Geography
It has 64902 households and total area 247.97 km2.

Demographics
As of the 1991 Bangladesh census, Rupganj has a population of 375,935. Males constitute 53% of the population, and females 47%. This Upazila's eighteen-up population is 187,590. Rupganj has an average literacy rate of 37.9% (7+ years), and the national average of 32.4% literate.

Administration
Rupganj Upazila is divided into Kanchan Municipality, Tarabo Municipality and seven union parishads: Bholaba, Bulta, Daudpur, Golakandail, Kayetpara, Murapara, and Rupganj. The union parishads are subdivided into 144 mauzas and 285 villages.

Kanchan Municipality and Tarabo Municipality are each subdivided into 9 wards and 9 mahallas.

Notable Place
Murapara Rajbari , Rasel Park.

See also
 Upazilas of Bangladesh
 Districts of Bangladesh
 Divisions of Bangladesh

References

 
Upazilas of Narayanganj District